Mezopotamya Agency (/ MA) is a Kurdish news agency based in Beyoğlu, Istanbul. It is described as pro-Kurdish by the Platform to promote the protection of journalism and safety of journalists of the Council of Europe (COE), and left-wing by the International Observatory of Human Rights. It publishes articles in Kurdish, Turkish and English language.

History 
MA was established on 20 September 2017 following a purge of many pro-Kurdish newspapers and news agencies. It publishes articles critical on the Turkish Government and the access to the website operated by Mezopotamya Agency has been blocked for more than 20 times by the Turkish authorities upon which each time Mezopotamya released their reports over a new domain. The agency often publishes articles from the predominantly Kurdish provinces of Turkey. MA's staff is often targeted by the Turkish authorities, their offices raided, their equipment confiscated and the journalists prohibited from entering public institutions. Several of its reporters have been arrested or been sentenced to prison terms. Journalists Sadiye Eser and Sadık Topaloğlu were arrested in December 2019 accused of being a member of a terrorist organization and released pending trial a few months later in March 2020. On the 6 October 2020, two journalists of the news agency were imprisoned after they reported that two peasants were thrown out of a Turkish military helicopter in Van Province. They were released in April 2021. Mehmet Aslan, who covered the situation of the Kurdish prisoners was imprisoned in January 2021, and released pending trial with an international travel ban in May 2021.

References

External links 
 

Companies based in Istanbul
News agencies based in Turkey
Kurdish-language websites
Turkish-language websites
English-language websites
Turkish companies established in 2017